The year 1949 in architecture involved some significant events.

Events
 January 26 – Fire breaks out in the golden hall of Horyu-ji Buddhist temple, Japan, causing severe damage to the building, mainly its first floor, and murals. As a result of the restoration (completed in 1954) it is estimated that about 15–20% of the original seventh century Kondo materials is left in the building; the charred timbers are carefully removed to a separate fireproof warehouse for future research.
 George Pace is appointed surveyor to the Church of England Diocese of Sheffield and establishes a private practice in York.

Buildings and structures

Buildings opened
 Early – Spa Green Estate in London, designed by Berthold Lubetkin of the Tecton Group with Ove Arup & Partners.
 August 20 – Las Lajas Shrine in Colombia, begun in 1916.
 December 16 – The Voortrekker Monument in Pretoria, designed by Gerard Moerdijk.

Buildings completed

 Ford House in Illinois designed by Bruce Goff.
 Glass House in New Canaan, Connecticut designed by Philip Johnson.
 Eames House in Los Angeles, California, designed by Charles Eames.
 Promontory Apartments in Chicago, Illinois, designed by Ludwig Mies van der Rohe.
 Church of Saint Francis Xavier, Kansas City, Missouri, designed by Barry Byrne.
 Googies coffee shop, West Hollywood, California, designed by John Lautner.

Awards
 American Academy of Arts and Letters Gold Medal – Frederick Law Olmsted.
 AIA Gold Medal – Frank Lloyd Wright.
 RIBA Royal Gold Medal – Howard Robertson.

Births
 January 4 – Peter Blundell Jones, British architectural historian (died 2016)
 June 14 – Bořek Šípek, Czech neo-baroque architect and designer (died 2016)
 August 26 – Dan Cruickshank, British architectural historian
 December 9 – Tom Kite, American professional golfer and golf course architect
 Demetri Porphyrios, Greek New Classical architect

Deaths
 March 1 – Gordon Kaufmann, English-born American architect known for his work on the Hoover Dam (born 1888)
 March 4 – Sir Charles Nicholson, 2nd Baronet, English ecclesiastical architect (born 1867)
 April 17 – R. Harold Zook, American architect working in Chicago (born 1889)
 May 1 – Josep Maria Jujol, Catalan architect (born 1879)
 September 27 – David Adler, American architect (born 1882)

References